The Spectre of Newby Church (or the Newby Monk) is the name given to a figure found in a photograph taken in the Church of Christ the Consoler, on the grounds of Newby Hall in North Yorkshire, United Kingdom. The image was taken in 1963 by the Reverend Kenneth F. Lord. As the figure appears to resemble a human, much speculation has been had regarding what type of person might be in the image. Most speculation by believers has concluded that it resembles a 16th-century monk, with a white shroud over his face, possibly to mask leprosy or another disfigurement. Others contend that it is an accomplice in a costume.

Initial claims suggested that the figure would measure at 9 feet tall, but its feet are not visible and it could easily be standing on a box, giving the impression of height.

On looking over the image, purported photographic experts have concluded that the image is not the result of double exposure, although Rick Burden, founder of the Ghost Hunters of Australia website, believes to be "probably fake." It resembles many other double exposure hoaxes.

References

See also
 Solway Firth Spaceman
 The Brown Lady

 

1963 works
1963 in art
Black-and-white photographs
English ghosts
People notable for being the subject of a specific photograph
1960s photographs